The men's freestyle 70 kg is a competition featured at the 2016 Russian National Freestyle Wrestling Championships, and was held in Yakutsk, Russia on May 27.

Medalists

Results
Legend
F — Won by fall
WO — Won by walkover

Finals

Top half

Bottom half

Repechage

References
http://wrestrus.ru/turnirs/215/table/70/1/
http://cs636318.vk.me/v636318357/a2c0/TJ-OoC7-pr4.jpg
http://cs7003.vk.me/v7003154/2063a/bwpS3MK3LeY.jpg

Men's freestyle 70 kg